Tara is a 2001 film, known in the United States as Hood Rat. Directed by Leslie Small, it was released direct-to-video, and was poorly received. It focuses on a soft homeless man who befriends a rat he names Tara.

Cast

References

External links

2001 direct-to-video films
2001 films
Hood films
2001 science fiction films
Films directed by Leslie Small
2000s American films